GNFM (formerly known as 2GN) is an Australian radio station serving the Goulburn region, which opened in January 1932 as 2GN on a frequency of 1390 kHz (1368 kHz between 1978 and 2022). Test broadcasting began on 9 December 1931. It is now co-owned by the Capital Radio Network and Grant Broadcasters, broadcasting on 107.7 MHz. The station carries a Classic Hits format and Forever Classic branding similar to its sister stations, 2CA, 6IX, XLFM and 3GG. The station's studios are shared with sister station, Eagle FM.

GNFM has an FM repeater serving the township of Crookwell and re-transmitting GNFM on 106.1 MHz.

On 12 May 2022, the station transitioned to FM and it was renamed GNFM. On 28 May 2022, the AM signal on 1368 kHz broadcast a retune message telling listeners to tune to 107.7. This remained the case until the AM signal on 1368 kHz was switched off in June 2022.

Programming 
GNFM features both local programming and syndication. GNFM also features local news bulletins, presented and produced in-house by Michael Prevedello.

Recognition 
In the 2014 Commercial Radio Australia Awards (ACRA's), Craig Prichard won the award for 'Best Entertainment/Music Presenter: Country'.

In October 2019, it was announced that 2GN news reader Michael Prevedello had won the 2019 ACRA category for 'Best News Presenter: Country & Provincial'.

See also 
 93.5 Eagle FM
 Capital Radio Network

References

External links
 107.7 GNFM official site

 

Radio stations in New South Wales
Radio stations established in 1932
Classic hits radio stations in Australia
Capital Radio Network
Grant Broadcasters
1932 establishments in Australia